Wigan North Western railway station is one of two railway stations serving the town centre of Wigan, Greater Manchester, England.
  
It is a moderately-sized station on the West Coast Main Line. It is operated by Avanti West Coast, and is also served by Northern Trains.

Both stations are centrally located on the southern fringe of Wigan town centre. The station is named North Western, not because of its location but because it formerly belonged to the London and North Western Railway. The drop in usage figures for Wigan North Western in 2006/07 was due to the adjustment of the allocation between the town's two stations. In 2009 North Western station was identified as one of the ten worst category B interchange stations for mystery shopper assessment of fabric and environment and was set to receive a share of £50m funding for improvements.

History

The Wigan Branch Railway opened between the Liverpool and Manchester Railway on 3 September 1832 at Parkside Junction (in Newton-le-Willows) and Wigan. The original station in Wigan was located close to Chapel Lane, and three trains per day were provided, connecting with the Liverpool and Manchester trains at Parkside.

The North Union Railway opened between Wigan and Preston and connected with the line from Parkside on 31 October 1838. Wigan station was relocated to its present position.

The London and North Western Railway was formed as a result of the progressive amalgamation of various earlier lines, including the Grand Junction Railway in 1846. In collaboration with the Caledonian Railway, through trains were introduced between London Euston and Glasgow.

On 2 August 1873, a major accident occurred at the station. An overnight express from London to Scotland derailed while passing through the station at high speed. 13 people died and 30 were badly injured. The subsequent inquiry into the accident resulted in the introduction of facing point locks to passenger-carrying lines throughout the UK.

1888–1894: The station was substantially enlarged. The London and North Western Railway's Manchester and Wigan Railway connected with the North Union Railway at Springs Branch, and services to Manchester Exchange via Tyldesley which began in September 1864, terminated at the enlarged station. This line closed in 1969.

It was renamed from "Wigan" to "Wigan North Western" on 2 June 1924.

During 1971 and 1972, the run-down Victorian-era station buildings were demolished and the track layout re-modelled as a prelude to electrification.   The re-built station was officially opened in July 1972.

On 1 October 1972, all signalling through Wigan North Western and adjacent sections of the West Coast main line came under the control of the new Warrington Power Signal Box.  Two large signal boxes were closed - Wigan No.1 and Wigan No.2, which had controlled train movements at the south and north ends of station respectively.

23 July 1973, Electric train services began between London Euston and Preston, via Wigan North Western. Express trains, formerly hauled by one or two Class 50 diesels, were now powered by Class 86 or new Class 87 electrics. 

On 6 May 1974, the West Coast electrification project was complete and electric trains operated through to Glasgow by British Rail.

Withdrawn passenger services

Being located on the West Coast Main Line, Wigan North Western has retained regular trains to a wide range of destinations. However, there were several local passenger services from the station which fell under the Beeching Axe and earlier, and the lines have since been closed:
 Blackburn via Chorley (passenger service a pre-Beeching withdrawal in January 1960: see Lancashire Union Railway)
From Boar's Head, a line ran to Adlington where it joined the Manchester to Preston Line as far as Chorley. From Chorley another branch line ran to Cherry Tree station and joined the existing line from Preston to Blackburn. In addition to the local service, this route was also occasionally used by long distance trains when these were diverted over the Settle and Carlisle line. Until at least 1963 a "private" non-advertised return passenger service was operated for workers at the Royal Ordnance Factory at Euxton.

 Manchester (Exchange) via Tyldesley (local stopping passenger service withdrawn 1962, with some remaining non-stopping local services withdrawn in January 1968: some expresses continuing until May 1969)
 The line from Wigan to Manchester Exchange via Tyldesley and Eccles was the L&NWR's route from Manchester to the north and Scotland. Before closure, this route was used both by local trains and by long-distance expresses between Manchester and destinations such as Windermere and Glasgow. Trains from Wigan North Western to Manchester Exchange travelled south for  along the main line before diverging onto the Tyldesley line at Springs Branch Junction. In fact the timings of the non-stop express trains were such that trains between Manchester Exchange and Wigan  could (and did) take the (longer) route via Lowton.

 Local trains along main line
 Passenger services were provided to a number of smaller stations located along the main line.   Except for Leyland and Balshaw Lane (which was reopened in 1998 as Euxton Balshaw Lane) these stations are now closed. Closure of some of these smaller stations started before the Beeching report (for example Boar's Head and Bamfurlong in 1949 and Golborne in 1962) and was completed in the late 1960s.

Local trains called at:

{| class="wikitable"
|-
|width="50%"|Northwards||Southwards
|-
| Boar's Head || Bamfurlong
|-
| Standish Junction || Golborne
|-
| Coppull || Lowton
|-
| Balshaw Lane & Euxton || Newton-le-Willows
|-
| Leyland|| Earlestown
|-
| Farington || 
|-
| Preston|| Warrington Bank Quay
|}
There are proposals to re-open some of the closed local stations (e.g. Golborne), but none have been approved as of 2018.

Wigan Central

Wigan had a third station: Wigan Central which has been demolished.

Wigan Central was located in Station Road, still in the town centre but some way away from the two main stations (at North Western and Wallgate). It was a terminal station on the branch line to Glazebrook and on to Manchester Central.

Wigan Central was opened by the Manchester, Sheffield and Lincolnshire Railway (later to become the Great Central) in October 1892 and was closed to passengers in November 1964.

Platform layout
 Platform 1 is used for some services to Stalybridge via Bolton and Manchester Victoria on Sundays.
 Platform 2 was a bay platform but is no longer in use after platform 3 was extended at the end of 2020.  The track serving it has been lifted and the face fenced off.
 Platform 3 is a bay platform, used by early morning and late evening Northern services to Manchester Victoria and  via  and the Calder Valley (as the December 2022 timetable rerouted Wigan to Leeds services to operate from Wigan Wallgate), Sunday services to Manchester Victoria via  and as a reversing siding allowing trains and locomotives for Springs Branch depot to approach from and leave south of the depot as it can only be entered from the north.
 Platform 4 is used for Avanti West Coast services to London Euston and Birmingham New Street & Northern Trains services to Manchester Airport and the express service to Liverpool Lime Street.
 Platform 5 is for northbound services to Glasgow Central and Edinburgh Waverley. It is also used for services to Blackpool North and Barrow-in-Furness.
 Platform 6 is used to terminate Merseyrail's City Line services arriving from the Liverpool-Wigan Line which is operated by Northern Trains and also rarely used for Avanti services if no other platforms are available.

The platforms have heated waiting rooms. The British Transport Police have an office on platform 4 near the station's cafe.

Services
The station is served currently by Avanti West Coast. There is an hourly service on the West Coast Main Line from London Euston, which continues northwards to Glasgow Central, with additional peak services terminating at Preston, Lancaster and Carlisle. The journey time from London is less than two hours (1 hour and 55 minutes). There is also an hourly service in the opposite direction calling at Warrington Bank Quay and London Euston. It is also served by Avanti West Coast's services from London Euston via Birmingham New Street to Blackpool North and Edinburgh (alternate hours). The single London Midland service from Birmingham New Street to Preston that used to call in the evening was withdrawn at the end of the 2007-8 timetable.

With completion of the first stage of the North West electrification programme, most TransPennine Express services between Manchester and Scotland were re-routed via Wigan instead of Bolton by connecting with the West Coast Main Line near Newton-le-Willows. TransPennine Express now operates services between Manchester Airport and Scotland. These services no longer call at Wigan North Western and have been re-routed via Bolton now that the line is electrified (work finally being completed in early 2019 ahead of the spring timetable update).

Northern Trains operates a half-hourly local stopping service from Liverpool Lime Street, along the Liverpool-Wigan Line via St Helens Central with a handful of services running to Liverpool via the Lowton Chord and Newton-le-Willows. On Sundays, the Liverpool - Wigan services do not run with the hourly  -  services calling at the smaller intermediate stations on the route to Liverpool.

Northern also operated one electric hourly service per hour each way between Blackpool North and Manchester Airport between May 2018 & May 2019. These were mainly operated by new Class 195 Civity units, whilst the electric variants (Class 331s) have started to appear on Liverpool services since the summer of 2019.

In the May 2018 timetable change, two trains per hour were introduced to/from Bolton - one to Manchester Victoria and Stalybridge, the other to Manchester Piccadilly and thence  via Stockport.  These ran on weekdays only - weekend trains were replaced by buses until November 2018 due to ongoing electrification work on the Manchester to Preston Line through Bolton and Salford Crescent.  From the December 2019 timetable change, most weekday services to/from Manchester via Hindley reverted to their previous route via Wallgate, with just a few trains starting or finishing here in the morning and both peak periods. From December 2020 until December 2022 however, the hourly service from Leeds started & terminated here once more throughout the day (save for a few peak period services). Most services via  towards Manchester now run from  station. An hourly service operates on Sundays to  via .

From the timetable change on 17 May 2015, Northern Rail introduced Class 319 electric services to Liverpool and Manchester, Avanti West Coast services southwards to London Euston and northwards to Glasgow are always operated by electric Class 390 Pendolino trains. Services southwards to London Euston via Birmingham New Street and northwards to Glasgow and Edinburgh are operated by either electric Pendolino trains or diesel Class 221 Super Voyager units.

Future train services
Under HS2 and government proposals' high-speed trains would stop at the station from Glasgow before joining the new HS2 line south of Wigan to Birmingham and London.

See also
Wigan Central railway station
Wigan Wallgate railway station
West Coast Main Line route modernisation

Notes

References

Bibliography

External links

Railway stations in the Metropolitan Borough of Wigan
DfT Category B stations
Former North Union Railway stations
Railway stations in Great Britain opened in 1838
Railway stations served by TransPennine Express
Northern franchise railway stations
Railway stations served by Avanti West Coast
Buildings and structures in Wigan
Stations on the West Coast Main Line